Get More Down is an album by Vermont-based jam band Phish, released under the alter-ego "Sci-Fi Soldier". The band's sixteenth studio album, it was released for streaming and download on October 31, 2022 and contains the twelve songs debuted during the band's Halloween concert the previous year. Continuing their tradition of a "musical costume" during the second set of each Halloween concert, this show saw Phish perform as the band Sci-Fi Soldier, a futuristic, superhero-themed group, complete with costumes and alternate instruments to fit the theme. Get More Down features studio recordings of these songs, some of which have entered the band's setlists in later shows.

Background

Musical costumes

Since 1994, Phish have carried out a tradition of a "musical costume" occurring in the second set in every one of their Halloween shows. While these sets started off as containing full covers of classic albums by other acts (such as The Who's Quadrophenia in 1995 and The Rolling Stones' Exile on Main St. in 2009), the band has experimented with the format in recent years. Examples include the 2013 concert, which featured songs from their then-upcoming studio album Fuego (tentatively referred to as Wingsuit), and the following year's show in which they "covered" the 1962 Disney spoken word album Chilling, Thrilling Sounds of the Haunted House, playing new instrumental compositions interspersed with excerpts from the original album.

The 2018 show saw the band claim to cover a long-lost progressive rock album, í rokk by a fictional Scandinavian band named Kasvot Växt. In actuality, this was yet another full album's worth of new songs by the group. These performances were later released as a standalone live album on streaming services the following November. "Sci-Fi Soldier" shares similarities with this performance, both of them having elaborate stage setups, costumes, and backstories for their respective fictional acts.

2021 Halloween Show

Before the band's 2021 Halloween concert, fans were handed comic book-style playbills containing a fictional backstory of Sci-Fi Soldier upon entering the venue. It depicted the group as futuristic superheroes, with a backstory containing references to past Phish events (such as the "Kasvot Växt" concert) and lyrics. The band members adopted alter-egos for the performance, using the names "Clueless Wallob" (Trey Anastasio), "Half-Nelson" (Mike Gordon), "Paulie Roots" (Jon Fishman), and "Pat Malone" (Page McConnell). Additionally, Anastasio and Gordon strayed from their typical instruments to match the performance's aesthetic.

Track listing

All songs written by Phish.

 "Knuckle Bone Broth Avenue" – 3:39
 "Get More Down" – 3:26
 "Egg in a Hole" – 3:26
 "Thanksgiving" – 0:49
 "Clear Your Mind" – 4:54
 "The 9th Cube" – 0:51
 "The Inner Reaches of Outer" – 2:15
 "Don't Doubt Me" – 3:05
 "The Unwinding" – 0:58
 "Something Living Here" – 2:31
 "The Howling" – 3:25
 "I Am in Miami" – 2:13

Personnel

Trey Anastasio  – guitar, vocals
Mike Gordon  – bass, vocals
Jon Fishman  — drums, vocals
Page McConnell  – keyboards, vocals

References

Phish albums
2022 albums